Ebox, EBox, EBOX or eBox can refer to 

 AC Propulsion eBox, a type of automobile
 eBox, the codename of the CT510 video game console by Lenovo
 zentyal (formerly named eBox), a unified network server software distribution